Jack Rabbit was a wooden roller coaster located at Clementon Park in Clementon, New Jersey. Opening in 1919, built by Philadelphia Toboggan Coasters and designed by John A. Miller, the coaster was open for 81 years before closing to the public in 2002. The coaster then stood standing but not operating for years until eventually being demolished in 2007. It was one of the oldest roller coasters operating at the time of its closure.

Incidents
On August 5, 1998, a train derailed before the lift hill and hit the park's management office, injuring the three passengers in the front car. They were taken to the local hospital and later released.

References 

Clementon, New Jersey